Svenska Folkskolans Vänner r.f. (abbreviated SFV) is a Finnish association aiming to support the schooling of the Swedish-speaking minority in Finland. 

Since the introduction of compulsory education in Finland in 1921, the association's main task has been to promote education, culture and free learning in Swedish in Finland. Each year, SFV also awards prizes, scholarships and medals, as well as grants in the sectors of education, culture and libraries, and liberal education.

History 
In the 1880s the language policy of Finland became more Finnish-centered. This led to the founding of SFV in order to guard the interests of the Swedish-speaking minority. This manifested itself in the founding of Swedish-speaking schools throughout the country (until 1917 part of the Russian Empire). The association published magazines, organised events and raised funds as well as tried to show the Russian authorities that they did not want to lose their mother tongue and go to Finnish-speaking schools or become Russian-speakers. The first secretary of the association was Axel Lille.

According to its mission SFV's activity consists of three main things:

 Awarding grants and scholarships
 Maintaining educational programs and publishing houses
 Publishing its own works

SFV is the seventh largest owner (with 7.88 % of the shares) of Veritas, a Finnish pension insurance company. The association also is the biggest owner of Axxell Utbildning Ab, a vocational school operating in nine municipalities in Swedish.

SFV also maintains  ('the Swedish Study Centre'), which has its origins in the SFV Lecture Bureau, founded in 1919. From 1998 to 2015, SFV also ran  ('the Swedish Production School', Sveps) in Helsinki and Föregångarna in Vaasa, both of which were transferred to Folkhälsan Utbildning Ab on 1 August 2015.

The seat of SFV is located in Helsinki but it has side operations in both Vaasa and Turku. The association is a member of the European Foundation Centre. As of 2017 the association has been chaired by Wivan Nygård-Fagerudd.

Publications 
Since 1886, the association has published an annual calendar and since 1922 a member magazine, Svenskbygden, which since 2015 is called SFV-magasinet. Four issues are published per year. Svenska Folkskolans Vänner sponsors the online version of the encyclopedia Uppslagsverket Finland, launched in 2009, which can thus be offered free of charge to readers.

Awards and grants 
In 2018, the SFV awarded a total of more than 3 million euros in grants, scholarships and awards. One of the association's biggest awards is Kulturpriset ('the Culture Award'), which is awarded from the Signe and Ane Gyllenberg Fund. The award is worth 15,000 euros.

In 2019 SFV gave a grant of 20,000 euros to Projekt Fredrika that aims to make the Swedish-speaking culture in Finland more visible on Wikipedia.

References 

Organizations established in 1921
Educational organisations based in Finland
Swedish-speaking population of Finland
Finland Swedish